Caladenia caesarea subsp. transiens, commonly known as the dwarf mustard spider orchid, is a plant in the orchid family Orchidaceae and is endemic to the south-west of Western Australia. It has a single spreading, hairy leaf and up to three small lemon-yellow flowers with red stripes. It is only known from a single small population near the town of Williams.

Description
The lateral sepals and petals spread widely. The labellum is lemon-yellow coloured with brownish-red stripes, projects prominently with a curled tip, has an irregularly serrated edge and two rows of shiny yellow calli along its centre. Flowering occurs between September and October and is followed by a non-fleshy, dehiscent capsule containing a large number of seeds.

Taxonomy and naming
This orchid was first formally described by Karel Domin in 1912 and given the name Caladenia filamentosa subsp. caesarea. Domin's description was published in Journal of the Linnean Society, Botany but in 1989 Mark Clements and Stephen Hopper raised it to species status. In 2001 Hopper and Andrew Brown described three subspecies, including subspecies transiens and the descriptions were published in Nuytsia. The epithet (transiens) alludes to the shape of the labellum which is intermediate between that of Caladenia filamentosa and the other subspecies of Caladenia caesarea.

Distribution and habitat
Dwarf mustard spider orchid only occurs near Williams in the Jarrah Forest biogeographic region where it grows under dense rock sheoak and wandoo trees.

Conservation
Caladenia caesarea subsp. transiens is classified as "Priority One" by the Government of Western Australia Department of Parks and Wildlife, meaning that it is known from only one or a few locations which are potentially at risk.

References

caesarea
Endemic orchids of Australia
Orchids of Western Australia
Plants described in 2001
Taxa named by Stephen Hopper